Daegok Station is an underground of the first line of Daegu city railroad in Daegok-dong in Dalseo-gu, Daegu, South Korea.
It is located on the boundary between Dalseo-gu Daegok-dong and Dalseong-gun Hwawon-eup Gura-ri. There are an exit and entrance for a Hwawon-eup Bolli-ri Bolli-jigu Bolli Greenvill. A southern extension into Dalseong-gun (county) was opened on September 8, 2016.

Station layout

References

External links 
  Cyber station information from Daegu Metropolitan Transit Corporation

Railway stations opened in 2002
Daegu Metro stations
Dalseo District
Dalseong County
2002 establishments in South Korea